Hojr Rural District is a rural district (dehestan) in the Central District of Sahneh County, Kermanshah Province, Iran. At the 2006 census, its population was 7,007, in 1,699 families. The rural district has 25 villages.

References 

Rural Districts of Kermanshah Province
Sahneh County